Diyllus is a small genus of katydids found in South America. Species include:

Diyllus discophorus Stål, 1875
Diyllus fasciatus (Brunner von Wattenwyl, 1895)
Diyllus maximus Beier, 1960

References

Pseudophyllinae
Tettigoniidae genera
Orthoptera of South America